Muratori may be:

People
 Domenico Maria Muratori (1662–1744), Italian painter
 Jack Muratori (1929-2001), Republican Party lawmaker from Queens, New York 
 Ludovico Antonio Muratori (1672–1750), Italian historian
 Raimondo Muratori (1841-1885), Italian painter, known for portraits and depicting religious subjects
 Saverio Muratori (1910-1973), Italian architect and urban theorist
 Teresa Scannabecchi (née Teresa Muratori, 1662–1708), Baroque painter, daughter of Domenico Maria Muratori
 Vincent Muratori (born 1987), French footballer

Other
 Murători, a tributary of the river Becaș in Romania
 Muratorian fragment, part of a copy of perhaps the oldest known list of the books of the New Testament